Arhopala kinabala is a species of butterfly belonging to the lycaenid family described by Hamilton Herbert Druce in 1895 . It is found in  Southeast Asia (Borneo, Sumatra, Peninsular Malaya)  The name refers to the type locality Kinabalu Park.

References

External links

Arhopala
Butterflies described in 1895
Taxa named by Hamilton Herbert Druce
Butterflies of Asia